Kuningas soundi is the third solo studio album by Finnish musician Nopsajalka. Released on 25 August 2010, the album peaked at number 29 on the Finnish Albums Chart.

Track listing

Charts

Release history

References

2010 albums
Nopsajalka albums
Finnish-language albums